Betrayal is the breaking or violation of a presumptive contract, trust, or confidence that produces moral and psychological conflict within a relationship amongst individuals, between organizations or between individuals and organizations. Often betrayal is the act of supporting a rival group, or it is a complete break from previously decided upon or presumed norms by one party from the others. Someone who betrays others is commonly called a traitor or betrayer. Betrayal is also a commonly used literary element, also used in other fiction like films and TV series, and is often associated with or used as a plot twist.

Definition
Philosophers Judith Shklar and Peter Johnson, authors of The Ambiguities of Betrayal and Frames of Deceit, respectively, contend that while no clear definition of betrayal is available, betrayal is more effectively understood through literature.

Theoretical and practical needs
Jackson explains why a clear definition is needed: Betrayal is both a "people" problem and a philosopher's problem. Philosophers should be able to clarify the concept of betrayal, compare and contrast it with other moral concepts, and critically assess betrayal situations. At the practical level people should be able to make honest sense of betrayal and also to temper its consequences: to handle it, not be assaulted by it. What we need is a conceptually clear account of betrayal that differentiates between genuine and merely perceived betrayal, and which also provides systematic guidance for the assessment of alleged betrayal in real life.

Ben-Yehuda's 2001 work ("Betrayals and Treason Violations of Trust and Loyalty" Westview Press) framed all forms of betrayals and treason under a unifying analytical framework using loyalty, trust and moral boundaries as explanatory tools.

Signature and consequences
An act of betrayal creates a constellation of negative behaviours, thoughts, and feelings in both its victims and its perpetrators. The interactions are complex. The victims exhibit anger and confusion, and demand atonement from the perpetrator, who in turn may experience guilt or shame, and exhibit remorse. If, after the perpetrator has exhibited remorse or apologized, the victim continues to express anger, this may in turn cause the perpetrator to become defensive, and angry in turn. Acceptance of betrayal can be exhibited if victims forgo the demands of atonement and retribution; but is only demonstrated if the victims do not continue to demand apologies, repeatedly remind the perpetrator or perpetrators of the original act, or ceaselessly review the incident over and over again.

If no true apology, atonement, real remorse and plan to change one's behaviors are present, then the one who was betrayed can accept that it happened, and that the perpetrator is unwilling or unable to change. No real change means they can do it again. Lack of validation from the perpetrator  can be been described as a "second assault," which can exacerbate the effects of the initial trauma incurred. Accepting the betrayal and going no contact is the best route forward. The alternative is to stay in connection and realize the trespass can happen again, and may choose to avoid doing certain things to decrease severity. For example, if a person gossips, do not tell them your secrets.

Betrayal trauma

Betrayal trauma has symptoms similar to posttraumatic stress disorder, although the element of amnesia and disassociation is likely to be greater.

The key difference between traditional posttraumatic stress disorder (PTSD) and betrayal trauma is that the former is historically seen as being caused primarily by fear, whereas betrayal trauma is a response to extreme anger. Fear and anger are the two sides to the fight-or-flight response, and as such are our strongest and most basic psychological emotions.

In romantic relationships
John Gottman's What Makes Love Last? describes betrayal as "a noxious invader, arriving with great stealth" that undermines seemingly stable romances and lies at the heart of every failing relationship, even if the couple is unaware of it. Gottman computed a betrayal metric by calculating how unwilling each partner was to sacrifice for the other and the relationship. A consistently elevated betrayal metric served as an indicator that the couple was at risk for infidelity or another serious disloyalty. Some types of betrayal in romantic relationships include sexual infidelity, conditional commitment, a nonsexual affair, lying, forming a coalition against the partner, absenteeism or coldness, withdrawal of sexual interest, disrespect, unfairness, selfishness, and breaking promises.

Double cross
Double cross is a phrase meaning to deceive by double-dealing.

Origin
The phrase originates from the use of the word cross in the sense of foul play: deliberate collusion to cause someone to lose a contest of some kind.

It has also been suggested that the term was inspired by the practice of 18th-century British thief taker and criminal Jonathan Wild, who kept a ledger of his transactions and is said to have placed two crosses by the names of persons who had cheated him in some way. This folk etymology is almost certainly incorrect, but there is documentary evidence that the term did exist in the 19th century.

More recently, the phrase was used to refer to either of two possible situations:
A competitor participating in the fix who has agreed to throw their game instead competes as usual, against the original intention of their collaborators – one "cross" against another.
Two opposing parties are approached, urging them to throw the game and back the other. Both parties lose out, and the perpetrators benefit by backing a third, winning party.

This use has passed into common parlance, so that, for example, in World War II, British Military Intelligence used the Double Cross System to release captured Nazis back to Germany bearing false information.

Betrayal blindness 
Betrayal blindness is the unawareness, not-knowing, and forgetting exhibited by people towards betrayal.

The term "betrayal blindness" was introduced in 1996 by Freyd, and expanded in 1999 by Freyd and then again in 2013 by Freyd and Birrell through the Betrayal Trauma Theory. This betrayal blindness may extend to betrayals that are not considered traditional traumas, such as adultery, and inequities. Betrayal blindness is not exclusive to victims. Perpetrators, and witnesses may also display betrayal blindness in order to preserve personal relationships, their relationships with institutions, and social systems upon which they depend.

The term "Institutional Betrayal" refers to wrongdoings perpetrated by an institution upon individuals dependent on that institution. This includes failure to prevent or respond supportively to wrongdoings by individuals (e.g. sexual assault) committed within the context of the institution.

See also

References

Bibliography for references

 Arnett, J. J. (2000). Emerging adulthood: A theory of development from the late teens through the twenties. American Psychologist, 55,5, 469–480.
 Festinger, L. (1957). A theory of cognitive dissonance. Stanford, CA: Stanford University Press.
 Freyd, J. J. (1994). Betrayal-trauma: Traumatic amnesia as an adaptive response to childhood abuse. Ethics & Behavior, 4, 307–329.
 Freyd, J. J. (1996). Betrayal trauma: The logic of forgetting childhood abuse. Cambridge, MA: Harvard University Press.
 Freyd, J. J., & Birrell, P. J. (2013).  Blind to Betrayal: Why we fool ourselves we aren't being fooled. Somerset, NJ:  Wiley.
 Freyd, J. J ., Klest, B., & Allard, C. B. (2005) Betrayal trauma: Relationship to physical health, psychological distress, and a written disclosure intervention. Journal of Trauma & Dissociation, 6(3), 83-104.
 Hensley, A. L. (2004). Why good people go bad: A psychoanalytic and behavioral assessment of the Abu Ghraib Detention Facility staff. An unpublished courts-martial defense strategy presented to the Area Defense Counsel in Washington DC on December 10, 2004.
 
 Hensley, A. L. (2007). Why good people go bad: A case study of the Abu Ghraib Courts-Martials. In G. W. Dougherty, Proceedings of the 5th annual proceedings of the Rocky Mountain Region Disaster Mental Health Conference. Ann Arbor, MI: Loving Healing Press.
 Hensley, A. L. (2009a). Gender, personality, and coping: Unraveling gender in military post-deployment wellbeing (preliminary results). In G. Dougherty (Ed.). Return to equilibrium: Proceedings of the 7th Rocky Mountain Region Disaster Mental Health Conference (pp. 105–148). Ann Arbor, MI: Loving Healing Press.
 Hensley, A. L. (2009b). Gender, personality and coping: Unraveling gender in military post-deployment physical and mental wellness. Ann Arbor, MI: ProQuest UMI.
 Hensley, A. L. (2009c). Betrayal trauma: Insidious purveyor of PTSD. In G. Dougherty (Ed.). Return to equilibrium: Proceedings of the 7th Rocky Mountain Region Disaster Mental Health Conference (pp. 105–148). Ann Arbor, MI: Loving Healing Press.
 Hersey, B. & Buhl, M.(January/February 1990). The Betrayal of Date Rape. InView.
 
 Johnson-Laird, P. N. (1983). Mental Models: Towards a Cognitive Science of Language, Inference, and Consciousness. Cambridge: Cambridge University Press.
 Maslow, A. (1954). Motivation and personality. New York: Harper.
 McNulty, F. (1980). The burning bed. New York: Houghton Mifflin Harcourt.
 Musen, K. & Zimbardo, P. G. (1991). Quiet rage: The Stanford prison study. Videorecording. Stanford, CA: Psychology Dept., Stanford University.

Further reading

 
 
 
 
 
 
 
 

Deception
Psychological abuse
Concepts in ethics
Interpersonal relationships